Charlotte Permell (born 8 July 1963) is a Swedish journalist and TV-reporter, formerly hostess of the nature shows Mitt i naturen and Mitt i naturen - Film on SVT. She was succeeded as hostess of Mitt i naturen by Linda Olofsson.

References

1963 births
Living people
Swedish television personalities
Swedish television journalists
Swedish women television presenters
Swedish women journalists